Lenny Rodrigues (born 10 May 1987) is an Indian professional footballer who plays as a central midfielder for Goa in the Indian Super League.

Career

Early career
Born in Cortalim, Goa, began to develop a passion for football when his grandfather took him to watch local matches. He began playing for Fransa-Pax before the club folded. Rodrigues then spent a year and a half with Salgaocar before turning down a professional contract with the club to join his boyhood club, Churchill Brothers. While with Churchill Brothers, Rodrigues helped the club win the I-League twice, one Federation Cup, and one Durand Cup. Also while with Churchill Brothers, Rodrigues made the transition from playing as a forward to playing as a defensive midfielder.

Pune City
On 22 July 2014, Rodrigues was selected as the first ever pick in the 2014 ISL Inaugural Domestic Draft by Pune City. He made his debut for the club in their first ever match against Delhi Dynamos on 14 October 2014. He started and played the whole match as it ended 0–0.

Dempo and Mohun Bagan loans
Prior to the 2014–15 season, Rodrigues was loaned out to I-League side, Dempo. He made his debut for the club on 17 January 2015 against Bengaluru. He started and played the whole match as it ended 0–0. The next season, Rodrigues was loaned to Mohun Bagan. He made his debut for the club in their AFC Cup match against Maziya. He started and played 84 minutes as Mohun Bagan won 5–2.

Bengaluru loan
After the conclusion of the 2016 ISL season, Rodrigues was loaned out to another I-League side, Bengaluru, on 15 December 2016. Rodrigues made his debut for the club on 7 January 2017 in their opening match against Shillong Lajong. Partnering with Cameron Watson, he started and played the whole match as Bengaluru won 3–0. Rodrigues then scored his first goal for the club on 5 March 2017 against Minerva Punjab. His 17th-minute striker was the only one in a 1–0 victory for Bengaluru.

Bengaluru
On 23 July 2017, Rodrigues was selected in the 8th round of the 2017–18 ISL Players Draft by Bengaluru for the 2017–18 Indian Super League season. He then made his re-debut for the side on 23 August 2017 in their AFC Cup knockout match against April 25. He started the match and scored Bengaluru's third goal in a 3–0 victory before coming off in the 89th minute.

On 20 April 2018, Rodrigues earned his only trophy for the club as a permanent player when he started for Bengaluru in their 4–1 victory over East Bengal in the Super Cup.

Goa
On 20 March 2018 it was announced that Rodrigues would move to Goa for the 2018–19 season. During the 2018-19 ISL season Lenny, along with Ahmed Jahouh formed a solid midfielding partnership for FC Goa. Lenny was one of the top five passers in the Indian Super League. He started all the league matches and Super Cup matches for FC Goa. He showed his potential of acting as a deep lying playmaker . He recorded the highest passing accuracy of nearly 85% among Indians which is very good considering Indian standard. His work rate in all matches throughout the season was impressive. He intercepted the ball,  tackled, and forwarded the ball. Due to his impressive performance throughout the season, he won the award of Indian player of the season for FC Goa.

ATK Mohun Bagan
In  2021 January transfer window he joined ATK Mohun Bagan from FC Goa, on an 18-month contract. He made his debut against Odisha FC, which ATK Mohun Bagan won 4–1.

International
Rodrigues made his international debut for India on 23 February 2012 against Oman. He came on as a substitute as India lost 5–1.

International stats

Honours

Churchill Brothers
I-League: 2008–09, 2012–13
Federation Cup: 2013–14
Durand Cup: 2009

Mohun Bagan
Federation Cup: 2015–16

Bengaluru
Super Cup: 2018
Federation Cup: 2016–17
FC Goa
Indian Super Cup(1):2019
 Indian Super League Premiers
Champions (1): 2019–20

India
 SAFF Championship runner-up: 2013
Nehru Cup: 2012

Personal life
In January 2020, he married Rayna Azavedo and lives in Goa.

References

External links
 
 
 Profile at Goal.com

Indian footballers
1987 births
Living people
Footballers from Goa
I-League players
Churchill Brothers FC Goa players
Mohun Bagan AC players
Dempo SC players
Indian Super League players
FC Pune City players
Bengaluru FC players
FC Goa players
India international footballers
Association football midfielders
People from Verna, Goa
ATK Mohun Bagan FC players